Neljänsuora is a Finnish pop band originally from Lohja.

Formed in 1998, it showcased the vocals of Antti Ketonen, earlier of the band Alvarn. Neljänsuora original band (made up of Antti Ketonen, Juha Mäki, Esko Mäki, Mikko Hägerström and Urho Sevón) was greatly affected by metal music.

In later years, band line-up changed with Urho Sevón leaving in 2005 and Esko Mäki more recently in 2011.

New members were admitted like Jarkko Pietilä and Jussi Välimaa (2005-2006) and they turned into a pop band. After long-standing member Esko Mäki left as drummer in 2011, he was replaced by Johan Murtojärvi.

The band is signed to WEA / Warner Music label.

Members
Present members
Antti Ketonen (vocals) (1998–present)
Juha Mäki (guitar, violin, backing vocals) 1998–present
Jarkko Pietilä (keyboards, backing vocals) 2005–present
Jussi Välimaa (bass, trumpet) 2006–present
Johan Murtojärvi (drums) 2011–present
Former members
Mikko Hägerström (keyboards, backing vocals)
Urho Sevón (bass, backing vocals) 1998-2005
Esko Mäki (drums) 1998-2011

Discography

Albums

Singles
(selective)

References

External links
Official website
Myspace

Finnish schlager groups